"Unintended" is a song by English rock band Muse, released as the fifth and final single from their 1999 debut album, Showbiz. It peaked at number 20 on the UK Singles Chart in June 2000 and reached number five in Norway in 2008.

Content
The lyrics tell the story of a person coming out of depression because they have recently found happiness from love, and they now wish to see their life through to the end.

Music video
The music video features many lovers 'blending' around each other as Matthew Bellamy and the band sit around. The blending effect is achieved using the slit-scan technique.

Release
The song was released on 5 June 2000 on 7" vinyl – backed with a live version of "Sober" – double CD – backed with "Recess", a live acoustic version of "Falling Down", "Nishe" and a live acoustic version of "Hate This & I'll Love You" – and cassette – backed with "Recess". It reached number 20 on the UK Singles Chart, becoming the highest-charting single from the album, and became a top-five hit in Norway in 2008, peaking at number five on the VG-lista chart.

Live Performances 

"Unintended" was performed consistently by the band until 2001. After this, it was performed occasionally in 2007, as well as on rare occasions during The Resistance Tour and The 2nd Law Tour. The song has not been performed since 2013.

Acoustic Version

On 23 June 2020 Matt Bellamy posted on his social media the release of an acoustic version of Unintended based on the arpeggio pattern from Bach's Prelude in C major from the Well Tempered Clavier.

On 26 June the single was released on YouTube, Deezer, Amazon Music, Spotify and Apple Music on an EP, along with two other versions:

 Unintended (Acoustic version)
 Unintended A.I. Dream V.3 (Obeebo A.I.)
 Unintended (Piano Lullaby) [Instrumental]

Also, Bellamy wrote a tweet:

Track listing

Charts

Release history

References

External links
 
 Obeebo, Inc. at www.obeebo.ai

Muse (band) songs
1999 songs
2000 singles
Rock ballads
Songs written by Matt Bellamy
Music videos directed by Howard Greenhalgh
UK Independent Singles Chart number-one singles